John of Fintona was an Irish writer.

Called "subtillissimus canonum doctor/a most subtle teacher of canon law" by Tommaso Diplovataccio, John was the compiler of a commentary on decretals.

It is possible that John was a native of Fintona, County Tyrone, Ireland.

References

 Theodore William Moody, Dáibhí Ó Cróinín, Francis X. Martin, Francis John Byrne, Art Cosgrove, edited by Dáibhí Ó Cróinín A New History of Ireland: Prehistoric and early Ireland, Oxford University Press, 2005,  vol.1, p. 968.

Canon law jurists
Medieval Gaels from Ireland
13th-century Latin writers
13th-century births
Medieval Irish writers
People from County Tyrone
13th-century Irish writers
Year of death unknown